Gregory (Greg) C. Fu is a Professor of organic chemistry at the California Institute of Technology and the Norman Chandler Professor of Chemistry. The current research interests of the Fu laboratory include metal-catalyzed coupling reactions and the design of chiral catalysts.  In particular, the group is focused on the development of nickel-catalyzed enantioselective cross-couplings of alkyl electrophiles and on photoinduced, copper-catalyzed carbon–heteroatom bond-forming reactions. The group works in collaboration with the laboratory of Professor Jonas C. Peters.

In 2014, he was elected as a member of the National Academy of Sciences.  He was awarded an Arthur C. Cope Scholar Award in 1998-1999.
He was awarded the Elias J. Corey Award from the American Chemical Society in 2004.

Education
Gregory Fu received his BS from the Massachusetts Institute of Technology in 1985, where he worked in the laboratory of Professor Karl Barry Sharpless, then completed his PhD at Harvard University in 1991 under Professor David A. Evans. He worked as a postdoctoral fellow with Professor Robert H. Grubbs at the California Institute of Technology from 1991 to 1993, before accepting an assistant professor position at the Massachusetts Institute of Technology, where he worked from 1993 to 2012. In 2012, he was appointed the Altair Professor of Chemistry at Caltech. Professor Fu is currently the Norman Chandler Professor of Chemistry at Caltech.

Awards and honors
 Received the Elias J. Corey Award of the American Chemical Society in 2004
 Received the Mukaiyama Award of the Society of Synthetic Organic Chemistry of Japan in 2006
 Elected to the American Academy of Arts and Sciences, 2007
 Received the Award for Creative Work in Synthetic Organic Chemistry of the American Chemical Society in 2012
 Elected to the National Academy of Sciences, 2014
 Received the Herbert C. Brown Award of the American Chemical Society in 2018

References

External links 
 Fu's research group at California Institute of Technology

California Institute of Technology faculty
Harvard University alumni
1963 births
Living people
Massachusetts Institute of Technology School of Science alumni
Members of the United States National Academy of Sciences